Benjamin Kudjow Thomas Boukpeti (born August 4, 1981 in Lagny-sur-Marne, France) is a French-born Togolese slalom canoeist who competed at the international level from 2003 to 2012. Competing in three Summer Olympics, he won a bronze in the K1 event in Beijing in 2008. Boukpeti was the first athlete from Togo to win an Olympic medal.

Early life
Born in Lagny-sur-Marne, France to a French mother, he holds dual Togolese-French citizenship and chose to represent Togo, the country of his father, in Olympic competition. He began kayaking at age 10. His elder brother Olivier is a member of the French flatwater canoeing team.

Canoeing career
Competing in the 2004 Olympics in Athens, Greece, he placed fifteenth in the first heat of the Men's K1 event to become the first Togolese to reach an Olympic semifinal, but only ranked eighteenth in the semifinal run and did not advance to the final.

In January 2008, Boukpeti placed first at the African Championships.

In the 2008 Olympics in Beijing, China, Boukpeti led after the semifinal, eventually claiming the Bronze medal in the K1 event, the first ever Olympic medal for Togo. After clinching his medal Boukpeti snapped his paddle over his kayak in celebration.

Following his Olympic success, Togolese Olympics fans expressed an interest in meeting him, as he was mostly unknown in Togo, only having visited that nation once, during his childhood.

Boukpeti failed to qualify for the 2012 Summer Olympics in London after he was beaten by Jonathan Akinyemi at the African Championships. However, Boukpeti received a wild card and was able to enter the event. Once again he managed to qualify for the final run of the K1 event where he finished in 10th place.

He recently completed management studies in Toulouse, France, where he lives.

World Cup individual podiums

1 African Championship counting for World Cup points

Commitment
Boukpeti is a member of the 'Champions for Peace' club, a group of more than 90 famous elite created by Peace and Sport, a Monaco-based international organization placed under the High Patronage of H.S.H Prince Albert II. This group of top level champions, wish to make sport a tool for dialogue and social cohesion.
http://www.peace-sport.org/our-champions-of-peace/

References

"Boukpeti: Togo's hero in Olympics", Xinhua, August 12, 2008

1981 births
Living people
People from Lagny-sur-Marne
French sportspeople of Togolese descent
Citizens of Togo through descent
Canoeists at the 2004 Summer Olympics
Canoeists at the 2008 Summer Olympics
Canoeists at the 2012 Summer Olympics
Olympic canoeists of Togo
Olympic bronze medalists for Togo
Togolese male canoeists
Olympic medalists in canoeing
Togolese people of French descent
Medalists at the 2008 Summer Olympics